The 608 area code covers much of southwestern Wisconsin, including the capital city of Madison as well as the cities of Waunakee, Mount Horeb, Verona, Sun Prairie, Monroe, Platteville, Lancaster, Lodi, Portage, Baraboo, Wisconsin Dells, Beloit, Janesville, La Crosse, Prairie du Chien, Prairie du Sac, Sauk City, Viroqua and Sparta.  It was created in 1955 as a split from area code 414, and was the third area code created in Wisconsin. Rapid growth of the area (specifically in Dane County) has brought the 608 area code close to exhaustion with most recent projections from NANPA projecting the need for an overlay code by late 2023. In September 2022 the Wisconsin Public Service Commission announced the 608 area code will be overlaid with new area code 353.

Counties served by this area code:

Ten-digit dialing
Prior to October 2021, area code 608 had telephone numbers assigned for the central office code 988. In 2020, 988 was designated nationwide as a dialing code for the National Suicide Prevention Lifeline, which created a conflict for exchanges that permit seven-digit dialing. This area code was therefore scheduled to transition to ten-digit dialing by October 24, 2021.

See also
List of NANP area codes
North American Numbering Plan

References

External links
Map of Wisconsin area codes at North American Numbering Plan Administration's website
 List of exchanges from AreaCodeDownload.com, 608 Area Code

608
608